The First Presbyterian Church is a historic church in Des Arc, Arkansas, USA. It is a single story brick building, built in 1913 in a vernacular interpretation of the Colonial Revival style. Its front facade has a neoclassical gabled portico with four supporting columns and entablature, and it has a two-stage belfry set atop its flat roof, with a bell-shaped copper roof. The congregation was founded in the 1840s; this is its third building.

The building was listed on the National Register of Historic Places in 1990.

See also
National Register of Historic Places listings in Prairie County, Arkansas

References

Churches on the National Register of Historic Places in Arkansas
Colonial Revival architecture in Arkansas
Churches in Prairie County, Arkansas
Presbyterian churches in Arkansas
National Register of Historic Places in Prairie County, Arkansas